
Gmina Mielec is a rural gmina (administrative district) in Mielec County, Subcarpathian Voivodeship, in south-eastern Poland. Its seat is the town of Mielec, although the town is not part of the territory of the gmina.

Villages
Gmina Mielec contains the villages and settlements of Boża Wola, Chorzelów, Chrząstów, Goleszów, Książnice, Podleszany, Rydzów, Rzędzianowice, Szydłowiec, Trześń, Wola Chorzelowska, Wola Mielecka and Złotniki.

Neighbouring gminas
Gmina Mielec is bordered by the town of Mielec and by the gminas of Borowa, Cmolas, Czermin, Gawłuszowice, Niwiska, Przecław, Radomyśl Wielki, Tuszów Narodowy and Wadowice Górne.

References
Polish official population figures 2006

Mielec
Mielec County